The Royal Hong Kong Yacht Club is a Hong Kong watersports club for sailing, rowing and paddling.

History 
In 1849 the Victoria Regatta Club was formed and later absorbed into the Hong Kong Boating Club which, in 1889, was in turn merged into the Hong Kong Corinthian Sailing Club. At the General Meeting of the Hong Kong Corinthian Sailing Club held in October 1893 a resolution was passed that application should be made to the Admiralty for permission to call the Club "The Royal Hong Kong Yacht Club" and to fly the blue ensign with a distinctive mark on the flag. A warrant was granted by the Lords of the Admiralty on 15 May 1894.

Early members were British only with military personnel on the board. Until the 1950s membership was exclusively reserved for Europeans. Women were not allowed to be full members until 1977 when Patricia Loseby became the first female member. Today, membership is open to all.

Unlike other organisations in Hong Kong that had been granted a royal charter, the club retained the "Royal" prefix in its title after the handover to China in 1997, although a majority of its members supported a motion to remove it, this fell short of the 75 percent majority required by two votes. Subsequently, the commodore at the time suggested that the club should adopt a "one country, two systems" principle as to the name, this being the principle by which Deng Xiao Ping, described the basis underlying the reunification of Hong Kong with the Peoples Republic of China.  At a Special General Meeting of members the proposal was enthusiastically adopted.  The club's English name remained "The Royal Hong Kong Yacht Club", and the club's Chinese title is simply "Hong Kong Yacht Club", without the use of the term 皇家 Wong Ka, meaning "Royal".

Facilities
The main buildings of the club are located by Victoria Harbour on the former Kellett Island, now part of Causeway Bay following land reclamation, and forming the western boundary of the Causeway Bay Typhoon Shelter. The club moved there in 1938, and the clubhouse was built in International Modern style in 1939 on the foundations of the old Naval Powder Magazine. It was designed by architects G.G. Wood and J.E. Potter of Leigh & Orange. The new premises were formally opened on 26 October 1940 by the Acting Governor, Lieutenant General Sir E. F. Norton. The building has been listed as a Grade III historic building since 22 January 2010.

In addition to Kellett Island, the club has two other clubhouses:
 on Middle Island
 The Shelter Cove, in Hebe Haven, Sai Kung District

Former headquarters in North Point

For 30 years prior to moving to Kellett Island, the main buildings of the club were located at No. 12 Oil Street, in North Point, then a waterfront location, before reclamation. The former headquarters and clubhouse in Oil Street, built in the Arts and Crafts style, was officially opened on 21 March 1908 by the then Governor, Sir Frederick Lugard. The building was subsequently used as a garage, government staff quarters until 1998, as a storehouse of the Antiquities and Monuments Office until late 2007. The buildings now house the Oi! arts center that aims to promote visual arts in Hong Kong by providing a platform for art exhibitions, forums and other art-related activities. The Former Clubhouse of Royal Hong Kong Yacht Club has been listed as a Grade II historic building since 1995.

See also

 Hebe Haven Yacht Club
List of International Council of Yacht Clubs members

References

External links

 Official Site
 Liu, Yee-shan, Louisa, "Redevelopment of the Hong Kong Yacht Club at Kellett Island", 1998, University of Hong Kong
 Heritage Impact Assessment on the Former Clubhouse of Royal Hong Kong Yacht Club at 12 Oil Street: Vol. 1 ( Part 1, Part 2 & Part 3), Vol. 2

Royal yacht clubs
1894 establishments in Hong Kong
Sports organisations of Hong Kong
Causeway Bay
Eastern District, Hong Kong
Organisations based in Hong Kong with royal patronage
Gentlemen's clubs in Hong Kong